Ryer Island is an island in the Sacramento-San Joaquin River Delta surrounded by Miner Slough and Steamboat Slough at their confluence with the Sacramento River, 6.5 miles north-northeast of Rio Vista. It is in Solano County, California, and managed by Reclamation District 501. The  island is named in honor of a California pioneer, Dr. Washington M. Ryer, and his family. A map prepared at the time of statehood shows the area divided by the west fork of the Sacramento River, with the western half identified as Priest Island and the eastern half identified as Sutter Island.

The California Department of Transportation (Caltrans) operates two vehicle ferry services to the island, connecting the following state highways:
 , towards Rio Vista
 , towards Ryde

Highway 220 then terminates at Highway 84 on Ryer Island, while the latter leaves the island north on a bridge, and towards West Sacramento.

See also
 List of islands of California
 Ryer Island Ferry
 Howard Landing Ferry

References

External links
 

Islands of the Sacramento–San Joaquin River Delta
Islands of Northern California
Islands of Solano County, California
Islands of the San Francisco Bay Area